Lourmarin is a commune in the Vaucluse department in the Provence-Alpes-Côte d'Azur region in southeastern France. Its inhabitants are called Lourmarinois.

Geography
Lourmarin is located in the French region of Provence, at the foot of the Luberon Massif where a southern pass debouches over the Luberon from Apt on the northern side of the Luberon. The pass divides the Grand Luberon from the Petit Luberon range, an area rich in Neolithic remains and noted for its dramatic massifs and rockscapes. The Aigues Brun brook comes out of the pass and runs just to the west of the village (Aigue is a Provençal language word for "water", coming from Latin aqua).

History
Lourmarin has been settled for at least a thousand years, and was probably a Neolithic campsite before that.

A fortress was first built at the site in the 12th century, and was rebuilt by Foulques d'Agoult in the 15th century on the foundations of the earlier castle. It was restored in 1920.

In 1545 the town was burned down because its population was predominantly Waldensian protestant.

Its mayor between 2001 and 2017 was Blaise Diagne, grandson of the like-named first Black African deputy and member of a French government.

Sights
Listed as "one of the most beautiful villages in France", Lourmarin nestles in the middle of vineyards, olive groves and almond trees.

Extremely picturesque, the village is a magnet for tourists. Prominent sites are the village itself, the pretty Renaissance castle, the Catholic and Protestant churches and the view from the village of the Proches Bastides, a large fortified farmhouse dating to the Middle Ages. Between the castle and the village stands a chapel built for Protestants. From the village itself it is 20 minute drive down to the Durance River and then about 40 minutes on to Aix-en-Provence.

Miscellaneous
Lourmarin was the birthplace of Philippe de Girard (1775–1845), an engineer and inventor of the linen spinning mill, as well as the name-sake for the town of Żyrardów in Poland (a toponym derived from the polonised spelling of Girard's name). Żyrardów is Lourmarin's twin town.

The writers Henri Bosco (1888–1976) and Albert Camus (1913–1960) both lived there and are buried in the local cemetery.

Another famous writer, British expatriate Peter Mayle lived in Vaugines, near Lourmarin, until his death in 2018. One of his books, A Year in Provence, giving the chronicle of a British expatriate who settled in the village of Ménerbes, was made into a TV series and a film. Another of his books was also made into the film A Good Year (2006) directed by Ridley Scott and starring Russell Crowe, which was filmed nearby in the same region. As a result, in recent decades Luberon and its towns and villages like Lourmarin and Ménerbes, which probably were the lesser known parts of Provence, even in France, became better known in the English-speaking world.

Twin towns – Sister cities

Lourmarin is twinned with:
 Żyrardów in Poland

Gallery

See also
 Côtes du Luberon AOC

References

External links

 Château de Lourmarin

Communes of Vaucluse
Plus Beaux Villages de France